The 2013 Rugby Championship, known as The Castle Rugby Championship in South Africa, The Investec Rugby Championship in New Zealand, The Castrol Edge Rugby Championship in Australia and The Personal Rugby Championship in Argentina for sponsorship reasons, was the second edition of the expanded annual southern hemisphere championship consisting of Argentina, Australia, South Africa and New Zealand. New Zealand as the 2012 holders, was trying to keep their 100% winning record in the championship after winning six from six in 2012.

The Championship began on 17 August with Australia hosting New Zealand at Stadium Australia and South Africa hosting Argentina at the FNB Stadium. The match between South Africa and Argentina was originally meant to be held at the Free State Stadium, but it was moved to the FNB to form a unique sports programme – Nelson Mandela Sports Day – in honour of Nelson Mandela.

The Championship concluded with South Africa hosting New Zealand at the Ellis Park Stadium and Argentina hosting Australia at the Estadio Gigante de Arroyito. Argentina were the only nation to reuse the same venues from 2012.

The Championship was retained by New Zealand after a 38-27 win against South Africa at Ellis Park on 5 October, keeping their 100 percent winning record in the expanded championship.

Standings

Fixtures

Round 1

Notes:
 Matt To'omua, Scott Sio, Scott Fardy, Tevita Kuridrani and Nic White made their debuts for Australia, with To'omua being the first Wallaby to make his debut against New Zealand in the starting XV since Rod Kafer in 1999.
 Ryan Crotty made his debut for New Zealand.
 New Zealand recorded a 100 test victories against Australia, making them the first ever team to record a century of victories over a single nation.
 With McCaw's try, he becomes the first New Zealand forward to score 100 test points.

Notes:
 With this win, South Africa records their biggest winning margin over Argentina of 60. It was previously 54 which they held from 2008.
 South Africa records the most points scored by one team in a match in either the Rugby Championship or Tri Nations. It was previously 61 by South Africa in a 61-22 win over Australia in 1997.
 South Africa records the biggest winning margin in either the Rugby Championship or Tri Nations. It was previously held by Australia in 2006 following a 49-0 victory over South Africa

Round 2

Notes:
 Tom Taylor made his debut for New Zealand.
 Tony Woodcock became the fourth New Zealand player to earn 100 test caps.
 With this win, New Zealand retains the Bledisloe Cup.

Notes:
 With this win, South Africa record their first away win in The Rugby Championship
 Bismarck du Plessis earned his 50th cap for South Africa.

Round 3

Notes:
 During the match, Dan Carter became the first player to pass 1400 international test points.
 Francis Saili made his debut for New Zealand (All Black number 1126).

Notes:
 Australia captain James Horwill was selected in the starting XV, but was withdrawn ahead of the match with a hamstring injury. Jake Schatz could have made his debut of the bench, but was ruled out hours before kick off with a knee injury.
 First win for South Africa at Lang Park and their first in Brisbane since 1971.
 The victory marks the biggest ever winning margin by South Africa over Australia in Australia.

Round 4

Notes:
 New Zealand retain the Freedom Cup.
 Owen Franks earned his 50th test cap playing for New Zealand.

Notes:
 Brumbies captain Ben Mowen became the 80th test captain for the Wallabies on just his 7th test.
 Australia retain the Puma Trophy.
 First match Australia has failed to score points in the second half since the home test v New Zealand in 2005.
 Juan Manuel Leguizamón earned his 50th test cap playing for Argentina.

Round 5

Notes:
 Fly-half Morné Steyn and prop Jannie du Plessis earned their 50th caps.
 Australia winger Chris Feauai-Sautia made his international debut at the age of 19, and scored his first international try.
 South Africa claim the Mandela Challenge Plate for the first time since 2009.

Round 6

Notes:
 South African Tendai Mtawarira earns his 50th test cap.
 Franco van der Merwe made his international debut for South Africa.
 Ben Smith scored his 8th try of the tournament, a new record in either the Rugby Championship / Tri Nations.
 New Zealand centre pairing Conrad Smith and Ma'a Nonu surpass the 50 starts shared by Ireland pair Brian O'Driscoll and Gordon D'Arcy to become the most-capped centre pairing.

Notes:
 Bernard Foley made his international debut for Australia, and scored his first international try.
 Felipe Contepomi made his final appearance for Argentina.
 First bonus point win for Australia in The Rugby Championship, and the most points scores in either the Rugby Championship / Tri Nations

Warm-up matches
On 3 August and 9 August, Argentina played two uncapped matches against a New South Wales Waratahs Barbarians team in La Plata and in Salta in preparation for the tournament. The NSW Barbarians was composed of 21 Waratahs players (mostly players not involved in the Australian set-up for the championship) and 13 Shute Shield players.

Squads

Note:
Ages, Caps and Clubs are off the starting date of the tournament (17 August 2013).

Argentina
Argentina 30-man Squad for the Championship was announced on 25 June.

Tomás Lavanini was added to the squad to cover the second row.

Australia
Australia 30-man squad for the Championship, including 8 uncapped players and the re-call of Fly Half Quade Cooper.

With captain James Horwill ruled out of round's 3 and 4 and with Hugh McMeniman also out injured, Sitaleki Timani was brought into the squad as cover for the second row, but kept his place in the squad for the final two rounds. Dave Dennis was added to the squad to replace Jake Schatz who was ruled out of the championship after picking up an injury in training ahead of round 3.

Benn Robinson and Chris Feauai-Sautia were added to the squad for the away fixtures against South Africa and Argentina, with Nick Cummins and Jesse Mogg withdrawn from the squad due to injury.

James O'Connor was removed from the squad on 20 September following an off-field incident that occurred following the Wallabies win over Argentina in round 4. Uncapped player Peter Betham was called in as his replacement.

New Zealand
New Zealand 28-man squad for the Championship was announced on 4 August. Joe Moody was included in the squad as injury cover for Wyatt Crockett – who had a knee injury. Three additional players will assemble with the squad as part of the wider training squad, but will be released to their provincial sides on the Wednesday of each Test match; these players are: Frank Halai, Jeremy Thrush, and Francis Saili. Following an injury to Francis Saili, Centre Ryan Crotty was added to the training squad but will be released to his provincial side along with Halai and Thrush.

With Dan Carter out for the opening two tests, and with Aaron Cruden and Beauden Barrett injured after the opening round with a knee and calf injury, Colin Slade and Tom Taylor were called into the squad as cover for the First five-eighths. Luke Whitelock was also drafted in to replace Luke Romano (groin injury) and Brad Shields to cover sidelined Liam Messam (hamstring strain). Rhys Marshall spent time with the squad as an apprentice hooker as did Liam Coltman and Nathan Harris. Matt Todd was called in after round 3 to replace the injured Captain Richie McCaw, who was ruled out of the championship following an injury.

Following an injury to TJ Perenara, Piri Weepu was called up to the squad for the final two rounds against Argentina and South Africa both away.

‡ – Included as injury cover for Wyatt Crockett.* – Part of the wider training squad

South Africa
South Africa 30-man squad for the Championship was announced on 3 August 2013.

On 18 August Lourens Adriaanse was added as a replacement for Trevor Nyakane, who was removed from the squad following repeated breaches of team protocol (he missed the bus and the team's flight to Argentina).

Pieter-Steph du Toit was added to the squad for the final two rounds with Australia and New Zealand playing at home.

‡ – Included to cover Fourie du Preez when he is unavailable to play for South Africa

Statistics

Points scorers

Try scorers

See also
 History of rugby union matches between Argentina and Australia
 History of rugby union matches between Argentina and New Zealand
 History of rugby union matches between Argentina and South Africa
 History of rugby union matches between Australia and South Africa
 History of rugby union matches between Australia and New Zealand
 History of rugby union matches between New Zealand and South Africa

References

External links
2013 Rugby Championship at ESPN

2013
2013 in Australian rugby union
2013 in Argentine rugby union
2013 in New Zealand rugby union
2013 in South African rugby union
2013 rugby union tournaments for national teams